KGPC-LP is a low power radio station broadcasting in a community radio format from Oakland, California.

History
KGPC-LP began broadcasting on February 6, 2015.

References

External links
 

Mass media in Oakland, California
GPC-LP
GPC-LP
GPC-LP
Radio stations established in 2015
2015 establishments in California
Community radio stations in the United States